In the Federal Democratic Republic of Nepal, a governor is the constitutional head of each of the seven provinces. The governor is appointed by the president of Nepal recommended by federal cabinet for a term of five years, and holds office at the president's pleasure. The governor is de jure head of the provincial government; all its executive actions are taken in the governor's name. However, the governor must act on the advice of the popularly elected council of ministers, headed by the chief minister, which thus holds de facto executive authority at the province-level. The Constitution of Nepal also empowers the governor to act upon his or her own discretion, such as the ability to appoint or dismiss a ministry, recommend president's rule for the president's assent.

Current governors

Selection process 
Article 164 of the Constitution of Nepal states that:
 being qualified for being a member of the Federal Parliament,
 having completed the age of thirty five years, and
 not being disqualified by any law.

List of governors by province

Province No. 1

Madhesh Province

Bagmati Province

Gandaki Province

Lumbini Province

Karnali Province

Sudurpashchim Province

See also 

 President of Nepal
 Provinces of Nepal

References

Governors
Governors of provinces of Nepal